

Belgium
 Belgian Congo
 Eugène Henry, Governor-General of the Belgian Congo (1916–1921)
 Maurice Lippens, Governor-General of the Belgian Congo (1921–1923)

France
 French Somaliland – Jules Gérard Auguste Lauret, Governor of French Somaliland (1918–1924)
 Guinea – Jean Louis Georges Poiret, Lieutenant-Governor of Guinea (1920–1922)

Japan
 Karafuto – Nagai Kinjirō, Governor-General of Karafuto(17 April 1919 – 11 June 1924)
 Korea – Saitō Makoto, Governor-General of Korea (1919–1927)
 Taiwan – Den Kenjirō, Governor-General of Taiwan (31 October 1919-September 1923)

Portugal
 Angola –
 Visconde de Pedralva, Governor-General of Angola (1920–1921)
 João Mendes Ribeiro Norton de Matos, High Commissioner of Angola (1921–1924)

United Kingdom
 Malta Colony – Herbert Plumer, Governor of Malta (1919–1924)
 Northern Rhodesia
 Sir Lawrence Aubrey Wallace, Administrator of Northern Rhodesia (1911–1921)
 Sir Francis Chaplin, Administrator of Northern Rhodesia (1921–1923)

Colonial governors
Colonial governors
1921